Bootzheim is a commune in the Bas-Rhin department in Alsace in north-eastern France.

Geography
The village is located a few kilometres to the north of Marckolsheim.   Adjacent municipalities are Mackenheim and Artolsheim.

Economy
Employment opportunities in the village are limited.   The traditional economic focus of the region is Sélestat some fifteen kilometres (ten miles) to the west. The river crossing of Marckolsheim with its associated locks and hydro-electric power station offer employment opportunities:  many low paid seasonal jobs are also provided by the Europa-Park theme park on the other side of the German border nearby.

Landmarks
The Romanesque period church of St Blaise.

Twin towns
  Plazac, Dordogne

See also
 Communes of the Bas-Rhin department

References

Communes of Bas-Rhin